Islak Islak is the first album by Turkish rock musician Barış Akarsu. It was released in 2004 by Seyhan Müzik after Akarsu's success at Akademi Türkiye (Academy Turkey). The album became famous thanks to its first single "Islak Islak" which is a well known piece from Cem Karaca, Turkish musician and childhood idol of Akarsu. Akarsu also pays tribute to his hometown with the song "Amasra".

Track listing 
 Islak Islak
 Mavi
 Kimdir O
 Gel Gör Beni Aşk Neyledi
 İsterdim
 Ayrılacağız
 Amasra
 Gün Olur
 Aldırma
 Bir Kasaba Akşamı

2004 albums
Barış Akarsu albums